Francesco Carboni was an Italian painter of the Baroque period. He was a Bolognese. He was the pupil of Alessandro Tiarini. He afterwards was a follower of Guido Reni. He died in 1635. Among his works are noted : a Crucifixion, with St. Theresa and Maggiore, and other Saints for  S. Martina in Bologna; an Entombment of Christ for  S. Paolo; and for the Servite fathers, a Decollation of St. John the Baptist''.

References

16th-century births
1635 deaths
17th-century Italian painters
Italian male painters
Painters from Bologna
Italian Baroque painters